Stefano Tempesti (born 9 June 1979) is an Italian water polo goalkeeper. He competed at five consecutive Olympics between 2000 and 2016 and won a silver medal in 2012 and a bronze in 2016. He is the second water polo goalkeeper to compete at five Olympics, after Spaniard Jesús Rollán. Tempesti was the top goalkeeper at the 2008 Olympics, with 83 saves. He was also the top goalkeeper at the 2012 Olympics, with 87 saves.

Biography
Tempesti started his career in his hometown's Futura Prato, before moving to RN Florentia. He remained there until  2003 when he started playing for his current team, Pro Recco. With Florentia he won a LEN Cup Winners' Cup in 2001, while with Pro Recco he won eleven consecutive national titles and five LEN Euroleagues (2007, 2008, 2010, 2012 and 2015). He debuted for the Italian national team in 1997 and won a gold medal at the 2011 World Championships, where he was chosen the Best Goalkeeper of the tournament.

Tempesti has two children with his partner Elisabetta. He manages the women's water polo team Mediostar Prato.

Honours
RN Florentia

LEN Euro Cup: 2000–01   ;runners-up: 2002–03

Pro Recco

Serie A1: 2005–06 , 2006–07, 2007–08 , 2008–09 , 2009–10 , 2010–11 , 2011–12 , 2012–13 , 2013–14 , 2014–15 , 2015–16 , 2016–17 , 2017–18 , 2018–19

Coppa Italia: 2005–06 , 2006–07, 2007–08 , 2008–09 , 2009–10 , 2010–11 , 2012–13 , 2013–14 , 2014–15 , 2015–16 , 2016–17 , 2017–18 , 2018–19 

LEN Champions League: 2006–07 , 2007–08 , 2009–10 , 2011–12 , 2014–15

LEN Super Cup:  2007, 2008, 2010, 2012, 2015

Adriatic League: 2011–12

Awards
 LEN "European Player of the Year" award: 2011
 Best Goalkeeper of 2009 World Championship
 Best Goalkeeper of 2011 World Championship
 Best Goalkeeper of 2012 World League
Member of the Second Best Team of the Decade in the World 2010–20 by total-waterpolo

See also
 Italy men's Olympic water polo team records and statistics
 List of athletes with the most appearances at Olympic Games
 List of players who have appeared in multiple men's Olympic water polo tournaments
 List of Olympic medalists in water polo (men)
 List of men's Olympic water polo tournament goalkeepers
 List of world champions in men's water polo
 List of World Aquatics Championships medalists in water polo

References

External links

 

1979 births
Living people
People from Prato
Italian male water polo players
Water polo goalkeepers
Water polo players at the 2000 Summer Olympics
Water polo players at the 2004 Summer Olympics
Water polo players at the 2008 Summer Olympics
Water polo players at the 2012 Summer Olympics
Water polo players at the 2016 Summer Olympics
Medalists at the 2012 Summer Olympics
Medalists at the 2016 Summer Olympics
Olympic silver medalists for Italy in water polo
Olympic bronze medalists for Italy in water polo
World Aquatics Championships medalists in water polo
Sportspeople from the Province of Prato